Tezz is a 2012 Indian action thriller film directed by Priyadarshan. It stars Ajay Devgn, Anil Kapoor, Kangana Ranaut, Zayed Khan, Sameera Reddy and Boman Irani. Malayalam actor Mohanlal appears in an extended cameo appearance.

The film is loosely based on the 1975 Japanese film The Bullet Train.

Plot 
Aakash Rana is an illegal immigrant married to British-Indian citizen Nikita living as a successful engineer. He is eventually caught and deported from the UK, thus crushing his dreams of an ideal life.

Four years later, Aakash returns with a vengeance on his mind and teams up with his former employees Aadil Khan and Megha to wreak some havoc. What follows is a bomb threat on a train and a tense railway control officer Sanjay Raina and anti-terrorism officer Arjun Khanna trying every trick in the book to avert the disaster and to apprehend the culprits. Sanjay Raina tries his best to save his daughter Piya, and the passengers in the train who are thrown in the mix are police officer Shivan Menon and his team of police force, who are escorting a prisoner on the same ill-fated train. Aakash demands 10 million euros to tell them how to disarm the bomb. The ministry does not want to give the money, but Khanna convinces them that the money will be given back and is a way to lure the terrorists.

After following Aakash's instructions and dropping the money in a river, he walks away. Megha gets the money and tries to get away. She evades the cops after a vicious chase, but unfortunately, she is killed by a van in an intersection. Khanna finds out that Khan is one of the bombers and chases him. Khan is shot in the leg, but he gets away after jumping from the bridge and landing on a jet ski driven by Aakash. Aakash once again demands money and asks it to be left in a dustbin. The dustbin falls inward, and Aakash runs away with the money even though the police attempt to pursue him.

Khanna and his team find out where Aadil is and go to arrest him. Aadil commits suicide with a bomb, almost killing Khanna. Aakash calls Raina and tells him that a note has been left at a restaurant called Delhi Darbar that tells how to defuse the bomb. However, the restaurant catches on fire, and the letter is burnt. Aakash visits Nikita and his son, and they arrange to flight out of the UK that night. Khanna visits Nikita and tells her who her husband is. After changing the plan (that they should leave the UK via train because the police have found out about his plan of leaving via plane), he goes to the train station. There he sees a video of Raina asking the bomber to call again as the letter was burnt.

Aakash calls Raina and tells him that the bomb was not connected to the wheels and the train will not explode if stopped. Raina stops the train, and everyone disembarks safely. Nikita, who is helping Khanna now, goes to the train station and sees Aakash and the news that the bomb threat was a hoax. Khanna pursues her and demands her to tell him where Aakash is, so that he can catch him. Nikita convinces to Khanna that it was not Aakash that she saw. Khanna refuses to believe her lies and convinces to her that Aakash is a bomber and this is the only time she can save the passengers. She tells him that he is lying to her again because the bomb in the train was a rumor and everyone is safe. Khanna tells her that she is actually helping a criminal, but she doesn't believe him because so many people's lives have been ruined by that law. She lets Aakash go, but Khanna finds out as Aakash's son calls him Daddy. Nikita tries to convince Khanna that it's not Aakash, but Khanna refuses to listen to her and chases him, and they fight. Aakash please to Khanna to let him go and explains why he took such drastic actions. Realizing that Aakash was a victim of deportation and wants to just be with his family again at peace, Khanna stays silent (hinting he will let him leave scot free). However, the police arrive; after seeing that Aakash had a gun, they shoot him.

In the end, Nikita receives a letter Aakash had written. It stated that the money (which Aakash asked for defusing the bomb) was in Aakash's bank locker. He also states that she should give half the money to Megha's brother and Adil's mother. He asks her to tell his son that what he did was to get justice. Finally, Aakash tells Nikita that if they ever meet in the next life, the end of their love story would be much better and bids her goodbye.

Cast 

 Ajay Devgn as Aakash Rana, an engineer, small-time criminal, and has an alliance with his fellow employees.
 Anil Kapoor as Anti-Terrorism Officer Arjun Khanna, a cop who tries to stop Rana and his friends.
 Zayed Khan as Aadil Khan, Aakash's employee who is a bomber and a stunt doubling ninja.
 Kangana Ranaut as Nikita Malhotra / Nikita Aakash Rana, Aakash's wife who has no memory of him since he became a criminal.
 Boman Irani as Sanjay Raina, Arjun's comrade whose daughter boards a train with a bomb
 Sameera Reddy as Megha Singh, Aakash's 2nd employee who was hit by a speeding van.
 Mohanlal as Shivan Menon (Extended cameo appearance)
 Danny Sapani as David, the train driver
 Manpreet Bambra as Arjun Khanna's daughter
 Philip Martin Brown as Police Chief Inspector Alan Fisher
 Dominic Power as Joseph
 Avika Gor as Piya Raina, Sanjay and Renu's daughter, who boards a train with a hidden bomb.
 Puja Bratt as Doctor Renu Raina
 Bhavna Pani as Radhika
 Cory Goldberg
 Naveed Choudhry as Worker/Mechanic
 Neeraj Vora
 Lee Nicholas Harris as Armed Police Officer SO19
 Jing Lusi as Reporter
 Jamie Maclachlan as Reporter
 Mallika Sherawat as Desi Club Dancer Laila (Item number in song Laila)

Music
The film score was composed by the musical duo Sajid–Wajid, and the lyrics were penned by Shabbir Ahmed and Jalees Sherwani. It was released by Eros Music and Venus Records & Tapes. The music launch was held in Delhi on 30 March.

Soundtrack

Track listing

Release
The theatrical trailer was released on 4 January 2012. The film was released on 27 April 2012 in 1950 screens.

Reception

Critical response
The movie received mixed reviews. Taran Adarsh of  Bollywood Hungama gave 3.5 out 5, writing "TEZZ is a taut, entertaining action spectacle. Those with an appetite for well-made thrillers should lap it up!"  Subhash K. Jha of IANS gave 3 out of 5 Stars saying "Not quite edge-of-the-seat, the thrills in Tezz are engaging enough to keep us watching".  Srijana Mitra Das of  The Times of India gave it three stars out of five.

Conversely, Kunal Guha of  Yahoo Movies gave the movie 1/2 out of 5 and calls this "an epic fail of bomb diffusion by Priyadarshan". Blessy Chettiar of DNA rated Tezz with 1.5 out of possible five stars and wrote in her review "May be Priyadarshan should stick to mindless comedies, so we can be sure we’re in safe territory. You won't be missing much if you skipped Tezz". Anupama Chopra of Hindustan Times gave the film 2 out 5, writing ″The best thing about Tezz is its length — mercifully short — and the action, choreographed by Gareth Milne (Bourne Identity, Bourne Ultimatum) and coordinated by Peter Pedrero.″ Rajeev Masand of  CNN IBN gives 1.5 out of 5 and says Tezz is "awfully boring for a film that promises speed and thrills".

References

External links 
 
 Tezz cast and crew details – Bollywood Hungama

2012 films
2010s Hindi-language films
Films set on trains
Indian action thriller films
2012 action thriller films
Films about hijackings
Indian heist films
Films set in England
Indian remakes of Japanese films
Films directed by Priyadarshan
Films shot in London
Films shot in Scotland
Films shot in Hampshire
Films about organised crime in India
Indian vigilante films
2010s vigilante films
2010s heist films